El Ferrocarril was a liberal Chilean newspaper created in 1855 to support the administration of president Manuel Montt. The newspaper was published for a last time on September 20, 1911.

See also
 El Mercurio de Valparaíso

References

1855 establishments in Chile
1911 disestablishments in Chile
Defunct newspapers published in Chile
Liberalism in Chile
Publications established in 1855
Publications disestablished in 1911
Spanish-language newspapers